Muhammad Shafi (born 18 February 1928) is a Pakistani sprinter. He competed in the men's 4 × 400 metres relay at the 1952 Summer Olympics.

References

External links
  

1928 births
Possibly living people
Athletes (track and field) at the 1952 Summer Olympics
Pakistani male sprinters
Pakistani male hurdlers
Olympic athletes of Pakistan
Place of birth missing (living people)